Dwyer Airport  is a former military airport of Marine Expeditionary Brigade, located south west of Lashkargah in southern Afghanistan.

See also
List of airports in Afghanistan

References 

Airports in Afghanistan
Helmand Province